Neighbor of BRCA1 gene 1 protein is a protein that in humans is encoded by the NBR1 gene.

The protein encoded by this gene was originally identified as an ovarian tumor antigen monitored in ovarian cancer. The encoded protein contains a B-box/coiled coil motif, which is present in many genes with transformation potential. This gene is located on a region of chromosome 17q21.1 that is in close proximity to tumor suppressor gene BRCA1. Three alternatively spliced variants encoding the same protein have been identified for this gene. One implied function lies in autophagy, where it acts a cargo receptor in selective autophagy.

Interactions
NBR1 has been shown to interact with FEZ1.

References

Further reading

Human proteins